Snow Creek Falls is a long series of cascades located in Yosemite National Park toward the eastern extent of Yosemite Valley. It descends a steep gorge on a sizeable stream that originates in May Lake to the north, dropping east of the trail that leaves the Valley above Mirror Lake en route to North Dome and other north-rim destinations.  Snow Creek Falls is the second highest waterfall in Yosemite National Park.

References
Matt Danielsson, and Krissi Danielsson. Waterfall Lover's Guide Northern California: More Than 300 Waterfalls from the North Coast to the Southern Sierra. Mountaineers Books, 2006. ; p. 202

Waterfalls of Yosemite National Park
Waterfalls of Mariposa County, California
Tiered waterfalls